Ecological Psychology is a quarterly peer-reviewed academic journal covering ecological psychology. It was established in 1989 and is published by Taylor & Francis. It is the official journal of the International Society for Ecological Psychology. The editor-in-chief is Richard C. Schmidt (College of the Holy Cross). According to the Journal Citation Reports, the journal has a 2016 impact factor of 1.227, ranking it 68th out of 84 journals in the category "Psychology, Experimental". Its major focus is on problems of perception, action, cognition, communication, learning, development, and evolution in all species, to the extent that those problems are related to  whole animal-environment systems. human experimental psychology, developmental/social psychology, animal behavior, human factors, fine arts, communication, computer science, philosophy, physical education and therapy, speech, etc., can be considered as significant contributors.

References

External links

Ecology journals
Experimental psychology journals
Taylor & Francis academic journals
Quarterly journals
Publications established in 1989
English-language journals